Brunella Borzi Cornacchia (born 1947) was an Italian diplomat who served as ambassador to Slovakia. She was born in Rome.

References

Italian women ambassadors
Ambassadors of Italy to Slovakia
1947 births
Living people
Italian diplomats
20th-century diplomats
20th-century Italian women